The Internet Age  is a 10-part Chinese documentary television series produced by CCTV. It was first broadcast on CCTV-2 from 25 August 2014 to 4 September 2014. It discusses the "Internet".

List of episodes
The original titles of the 10 episodes (in Chinese) are listed as follows, each with an accompanying rough translation in English.

 (Age)
 (Wave)
 (Energy)
 (Reconstruction)
 (Rise)
 (Migration)
 (Control)
 (Worry)
 (World)
 (Overlooking)

Commentators
The following are commentators who appear on the miniseries:
Manuel Castells
Tim Berners-Lee
Nicholas Negroponte
Jerry Yang
Kevin Kelly
Bob Kahn
Elon Musk
Thomas Friedman
Michael Moritz
Chris Anderson
Reid Hoffman
Robert Taylor
Lawrence Summers
Lawrence Roberts
John Naisbitt
Robert Metcalfe
Xu Rongsheng
Hu Qiheng
Ma Yun
Zhang Chaoyang
Ding Lei
Charles Zhang
Zhou Hongwei

References

External links
 The Internet Age CCTV

Chinese documentary television series
China Central Television original programming
2014 Chinese television series debuts
2014 Chinese television series endings
Internet in China